From Generation to Generation is a 1959 American short documentary film directed by Francis Thompson and Philip Stapp and produced by Edward F. Cullen. The film shows live-action scenes of a farming family expecting a child in conjunction with animated scenes of the human reproductive system.

From Generation to Generation was nominated for an Academy Award for Best Documentary Short.

See also
 List of American films of 1959

References

External links

1959 films
1959 short films
1959 documentary films
American short documentary films
1950s short documentary films
Short films with live action and animation
1950s English-language films
1950s American films